Canadian Mexicans are Mexican citizens who have Canadian ancestry or are immigrants from Canada.

An important Canadian-descended group is the Plautdietsch-speaking "Russian" Mennonites and their descendants, who emigrated from Canada to Mexico starting in 1922.

History

Early immigration
Individuals born in what is now Canada have been present in Mexico since the early republic. For example, the Quebec-born Michel Branamour Menard was a settler of Mexican Texas and became a Mexican citizen.

An important Canadian immigrant was engineer Carlos Henry Bosdet, who set up the first telephone line in Mexico in 1878.

Canadian immigrants were first tabulated in the 1900 census. A total of 140 individuals, 102 men and 38 women, were counted.

Mennonite immigration

The ancestors of the Mennonites living in Mexico arrived via Canada. Migration to Mexico took place mainly in the years 1922 to 1927, with smaller groups coming after World War II.

The 1930 census counted 7,779 Canadian immigrants; 3,862 men and 3,917 women. Most, but not all, of these immigrants were Mennonites.

The first settlers moved to the State of Chihuahua (near Cuauhtemoc) and Durango (near Nuevo Ideal). Later daughter-settlements in other states were established (San Luis Potosí, Sinaloa, Sonora, Zacatecas, Campeche, Quintana Roo and Tamaulipas). Today, there are about 100,000 Mennonites in Mexico.

Recent immigration

Contemporary Canadian emigrants to Mexico consist mainly of working professionals that settle in larger cities and retired individuals living in smaller towns. 

According to Canada's Department of Foreign Affairs and International Trade, there are about 6,000 Canadians living in Mexico, but only 3,000 are registered with the Canadian Embassy in Mexico City. According to statistics from Mexico's National Institute of Statistics and Geography, in 2009 there were 10,869 Canadian-born persons living in Mexico.

According to INEGI's 2020 census, there are 12,439 Canadian-born emigrants residing in Mexico.

Notable individuals
Notable Mexicans of Canadian origin include the artist Arnold Belkin, cinematographer Alex Phillips, actress Fannie Kauffman, and the wrestler Vampiro Canadiense.

See also

 Canada–Mexico relations
 Mexican Canadian
 American Mexican

References

Immigration to Mexico
 
 
Ethnic groups in Mexico
Canada–Mexico relations